Acraephnes inscripta is a moth in the family Depressariidae. It was described by Alfred Jefferis Turner in 1947. It is found in Australia, where it has been recorded from South Australia.

References

Moths described in 1947
Acraephnes
Taxa named by Alfred Jefferis Turner
Moths of Australia